Tischeria dodonea is a moth of the family Tischeriidae. It is found from Fennoscandia to the Pyrenees, Italy and Romania and from Ireland to Ukraine. There is a disjunct population in eastern Russia.

The moth is difficult to distinguish from Tischeria ekebladella (T. dodonea forewings are yellower, less fuscous-tinged towards apex ; hindwings dark grey). Certain identification requires examination of a genitalia preparation.  Adults are on wing mainly June depending on the location.

The larvae feed on Castanea sativa and Quercus species, including Quercus faginea, Quercus macrolepis, Quercus petraea, Quercus pubescens, Quercus robur  and Quercus rubra, x turneri. They mine the leaves of their host plant. The mine consists of a brick red, upper-surface blotch, not preceded by a corridor. Almost all frass is ejected through a slit in the upper epidermis, at the margin of the mine. There is a characteristic pattern of fine concentric lines around the site of oviposition (egg laying). The larva makes a flat saucer-shaped cocoon, where it rests during feeding pauses.

External links
Larval stage info
bladmineerders.nl 
imago at UKMoths
Swedish moths
UK leafminers

Tischeriidae
Moths of Europe
Moths described in 1858